Neither Here nor There is a retrospective artbook by the Melvins, which was released in 2004 through Ipecac Recordings to celebrate their 20th anniversary. The book consists of 228 pages of art, photos, essays, stories and liner notes by a variety of contributors including dälek, Camille Rose Garcia, Alex Grey, Tom Hazelmyer, Adam Jones, Frank Kozik, Mackie Osborne, the late Stanisław Szukalski, Greg Werckman and many others. It also contains a band picked best-of CD.

The book has gone out-of-print. It was available in a limited hardcover edition and a softcover edition.

Track listing

Partial band personnel 
 Buzz Osborne – guitar, vocals
 Dale Crover – drums, vocals
 Kevin Rutmanis – bass (4, 7, 11, 18)
with
 Mark Deutrom – bass (1, 5, 15)
 Dirty Walt – valve trombone (1)
 Mac Mann – organ & grand piano (1)
 Joe Preston – bass (2, 9)
 Lori "Lorax" Black – bass (3, 8, 12)
 Matt Lukin – bass (10, 13, 16, 18)
 Mike Dillard – drums (13)
 Adam Jones – guitar (18)

2004 greatest hits albums
Melvins compilation albums
Ipecac Recordings compilation albums